Symphonic Buck-Tick in Berlin is an orchestral arrangement album by the Japanese rock band Buck-Tick. It was released on July 21, 1990 through Victor Entertainment. It is composed of rearrangements of Buck-Tick songs by several different composers, all performed by the Berlin Chamber Orchestra.

Track listing
"Maboroshi no Miyako" (幻の都; Illusion City)
"Just One More Kiss"
"Silent Night"
"Hyper Love"
"Aku no Hana" (悪の華; Evil Flower)
"...In Heaven..."
"Illusion"
"Love Me"
"Kiss Me Goodbye"

References

Buck-Tick albums
1990 remix albums
Victor Entertainment remix albums